Saastna is a village in Lääneranna Parish, Pärnu County, in western Estonia. The village is located the Saastna Peninsula in Matsalu National Park.

References

 

Villages in Pärnu County